Anja Spasojević (Cyrillic: Ања Спасојевић; born 4 July 1983) is a retired Serbian professional volleyball player who was last played as wing spiker for Dinamo Krasnodar in Russia. She began her professional career in Red Star Belgrade, and then played in Asystel Novara, Voléro Zürich, Fenerbahçe Acıbadem, Universitet Belgorod, RC Cannes, Universal Volley Modena, Ufimochka Ufa and then was ended her career in Dinamo Krasnodar. With Serbia national team, Spasojević won Bronze medal at the 2006 FIVB Women's World Championship and Silver medal at the 2007 Women's European Volleyball Championship.

Personal life
Anja Spasojević is fluent in Serbian, English, Italian and German.

Controversies
Spasojević did not play for Serbia national team at the 2008 Summer Olympics qualification tournament due to an injury, and it attracted many controversies. She explained she had had problems with injuries since the 2007 European Championship, but that "some persons did not believe it was a serious injury". Spasojević also confirmed the conflict with the team manager Zoran Terzić and the rest of the team, and that the two had tried to settle things down. She announced she would not play for the national team at the 2008 Summer Olympics, but that she might return in the future. But from that period Spasojević was not capped for the national team.

Clubs
  Crvena Zvezda (1998–04)
  Sant'Orsola Asystel Novara (2004–07)
  Voléro Zürich (2007–08)
  Fenerbahçe Acıbadem (2008–09)
  Universitet Belgorod (2009–10)
  RC Cannes (2010–12)
  Universal Volley Modena (2012–13)
  Ufimochka Ufa (2013)
  Dinamo Krasnodar (2013–14)

Awards

Individuals
 2002 Best Sportswoman of 2002 Best Sportswoman of SD Crvena Zvezda
 2006–07 CEV Cup "Best Server"

Clubs
 2006 Italian Super Cup -  Champion, with Sant'Orsola Asystel Novara
 2006 CEV Top Teams Cup -  Champion, with Asystel Novara
 2007 CEV Cup -  Bronze Medal, with Asystel Novara
 2009 Turkish Championship -  Champion, with Fenerbahçe Acıbadem

National Senior Team
 2006 FIVB World Championship -  Bronze Medal
 2007 European Championship -  Silver Medal

References

External links
 Anja Spasojević at the Fédération Internationale de Volleyball
 Anja Spasojević at the Confédération Européenne de Volleyball

1983 births
Living people
Sportspeople from Belgrade
Serbian women's volleyball players
Serbia and Montenegro expatriate sportspeople in Switzerland
Serbian expatriate sportspeople in Switzerland
Serbian expatriate sportspeople in Russia
Serbian expatriate sportspeople in France
Serbian expatriate sportspeople in Italy
Serbian expatriate sportspeople in Turkey
Expatriate volleyball players in Switzerland
Expatriate volleyball players in Russia
Expatriate volleyball players in Italy
Expatriate volleyball players in France
Expatriate volleyball players in Turkey